Established in 2004, the Theodore Roosevelt National Wildlife Refuge is part of the Theodore Roosevelt National Wildlife Refuge Complex in Mississippi.  Although the acquisition boundary for Theodore Roosevelt National Wildlife Refuge has been proposed near Onward, Mississippi, the land exchanges that are prerequisite have not yet been completed.  Consequently, the refuge has not been opened for public use.

References
Refuge website

National Wildlife Refuges in Mississippi
Protected areas established in 2004
Protected areas of Holmes County, Mississippi
Protected areas of Humphreys County, Mississippi
Protected areas of Leflore County, Mississippi
Protected areas of Sharkey County, Mississippi
Protected areas of Warren County, Mississippi
Protected areas of Washington County, Mississippi